This is a list of notable Ukrainian Canadians, including both original immigrants who obtained Canadian citizenship and their Canadian descendants. 
To be included in this list, the person must have a Wikipedia article showing they are Ukrainian Canadian or must have references showing they are Ukrainian Canadian and are notable.

Actors / entertainers / filmmakers 

Roman Danylo, comedian
Erik Everhard, actor and director
Fred Ewanuick, actor
Luba Goy, comedian
Jeremy Kushnier, actor/singer, currently in the Chicago cast of the musical Jersey Boys
Mimi Kuzyk, actress
Tatiana Maslany, actress, who is best known for playing various roles in Orphan Black
Stacie Mistysyn – actress (Degrassi)
James Motluk, filmmaker
Seth Rogen - actor (of Jewish religion)
William Shatner, actor, who is best known for playing a role in Star Trek (of Jewish religion)
Adam Smoluk, director, screenwriter and actor
Alex Trebek, television game show host (Jeopardy!)
Katheryn Winnick, actress

Artists and designers 
Edward Burtynsky, photographer 
Denys Drozdyuk, ballroom dancer, Season 3 winner of So You Think You Can Dance Canada
Alexander Hryshko, photographer
John Kricfalusi, cartoonist, creator of the Nickelodeon animated series
William Kurelek, artist
Oleg Lipchenko, artist
 John Max, photographer

Athletes

Gene Achtymichuk, ice hockey player
Dave Andreychuk, ice hockey player
Dave Babych, ice hockey player
Stan Baluik, ice hockey player
Jeff Bandura, ice hockey player
Bill Barilko, ice hockey player
Nadiia Bashynska, ice dancer
Mike Bossy, ice hockey player
Johnny Bower, ice hockey player
Johnny Boychuk, ice hockey player
Zach Boychuk, ice hockey player
Darren Boyko, ice hockey player
Tyler Bozak, ice hockey player
Turk Broda, ice hockey player
Johnny Bucyk, ice hockey player
Kerry Burtnyk, curler
Mike Busniuk, ice hockey player
Ron Busniuk, ice hockey player
Gerald Diduck, ice hockey player
Bernie Federko, ice hockey player
Dean Fedorchuk, ice hockey player
Todd Fedoruk, ice hockey player
Brent Fedyk, ice hockey player
Randy Ferbey, curler
Alexander Godynyuk, ice hockey player
Wayne Gretzky, ice hockey player and coach
Nick Harbaruk, ice hockey player
Dale Hawerchuk, ice hockey player
Neil Hawryliw, ice hockey player
Darcy Hordichuk, ice hockey player
Doug Houda, ice hockey player
Jim Hrycuik, ice hockey player
Scott Humeniuk, ice hockey player
Chris Jericho, professional wrestler
Orest Kindrachuk, ice hockey player
Morgan Klimchuk, ice hockey player
Julian Klymkiw, ice hockey player
Mike Kostiuk, gridiron football player
Danny Lewicki, ice hockey player
Joffrey Lupul, ice hockey player
Cale Makar, ice hockey player
Clint Malarchuk, ice hockey player
Mike Maneluk, ice hockey player
Brian Marchinko, ice hockey player
Dave Marcinyshyn, ice hockey player
Orest Meleschuk, curler
Gerry Melnyk, ice hockey player
Larry Melnyk, ice hockey player
Nick Mickoski, ice hockey player
Bill Mosienko, ice hockey player, fastest hat-trick in NHL history (3 goals in 21 game seconds)
Bronko Nagurski, gridiron football player and professional wrestler
Eric Nesterenko, ice hockey player
Kelly Olynyk, basketball player 
Nolan Patrick, ice hockey player
Walt Poddubny, ice hockey player
Alexei Ponikarovsky, ice hockey player
Terry Sawchuk, ice hockey player
Dave Semenko, ice hockey player
Eddie Shack, ice hockey player
Jack Shewchuk, ice hockey player
Gary Shuchuk, ice hockey player
Vic Stasiuk, ice hockey player
Walt Tkaczuk, ice hockey player
Jordin Tootoo, ice hockey player
Alexander Vasilevski, ice hockey player
Darcy Wakaluk, ice hockey player
Ed Werenich, curler
Mike Woloschuk, curler
Dale Yakiwchuk, ice hockey player
Ken Yaremchuk, ice hockey player
Miles Zaharko, ice hockey player

Business figures 
Eugene Melnyk, owner of Biovail Pharma and the Ottawa Senators NHL hockey team

Government / civil servants

Edward Bayda, former Chief Justice of Saskatchewan
John Sopinka, puisne justice, Supreme Court of Canada

Military figures 

Peter Dmytruk, war hero (World War II), Royal Canadian Air Force
Filip Konowal, World War I Victoria Cross recipient
Paul Wynnyk Lieutenant General, 2016-2018 Commander of the Canadian Army.

Musicians 

Randy Bachman, musician
Paul Brandt (born Paul Rennée Belobersycky), country music artist
Boris Brott, conductor
Ron Cahute, musician 
Rick Danko, musician, former bassist and singer of The Band
Ivan and Stefan Doroschuk, musicians (Men Without Hats)
Gordie Johnson, musician
Juliette, singer and  CBC television host
Brett Kissel, country music artist
Metro Radomsky, violinist and bandleader
Theresa Sokyrka, singer
Roman Soltykewych, conductor
Alex Tanas, musician, drummer of Magic!

Politicians 
Yvan Baker, member of parliament
James Bezan, member of parliament
David Chernushenko, the former senior deputy to the leader of the Green Party of Canada, and a former leadership contestant for that party
Ernie Eves, former Premier of Ontario
Ed Ewasiuk, labour activist, city councilor 
Sylvia Fedoruk, Canadian scientist, curler, and former Lieutenant Governor of Saskatchewan
Taras Ferley, first Ukrainian member of the Legislative Assembly of Manitoba
Gary Filmon, former Premier of Manitoba
Chrystia Freeland, Canadian Minister of Foreign Affairs since January 10, 2017 (see also "Writers / journalists" section)
William Hawrelak, former Mayor of Edmonton
Anthony Hlynka, second Canadian MP of Ukrainian descent, active in reforming Canada's immigration laws to promote eastern European immigration after World War II
Ramon John Hnatyshyn, former Governor General of Canada
Stephen Juba, former Mayor of Winnipeg
Gerard Kennedy, Ontario cabinet minister
Tymofei Koreichuk, labour organiser
Peter Liba, former Lieutenant Governor of Manitoba
MaryAnn Mihychuk, member of parliament, former Canadian Minister of Employment, Workforce, and Labour
Steve Peters, Ontario cabinet minister
Roy Romanow, former Premier of Saskatchewan
Don Rusnak, member of parliament
Edward Schreyer, former Governor General of Canada
Andrew Shandro, first member of a Canadian legislature of Ukrainian origin, World War I veteran
Michael Starr (born Michael Starchewsky), former cabinet minister
Ed Stelmach, Premier of Alberta from 2006 to 2011
David Tkachuk, Canadian senator
Judy Wasylycia-Leis, former member of parliament, former Manitoba provincial cabinet minister
Patrick Weiler, member of parliament
Borys Wrzesnewskyj, member of parliament
John Yaremko, longest serving cabinet minister
Paul Yuzyk, former senator

Religious figures 
Metropolitan Wasyly (Fedak), former primate and metropolitan of the Ukrainian Orthodox Church of Canada
Metropolitan Michael (Khoroshy), former metropolitan of the Ukrainian Orthodox Church of Canada

Scientists / scholars 

Albert Bandura, psychologist
Roberta Bondar, astronaut
Isydore Hlynka, biochemist, Ukrainian Canadian community leader
Joshua Kutryk, astronaut
Taras Kuzio, Ukraine expert
George S. N. Luckyj, scholar of Ukrainian literature
Lubomyr Romankiw, scientist, Ph.D. degrees in metallurgy and materials
Jaroslav Rudnyckyj, linguist, a founding father of Canadian multiculturalism

Writers / journalists 
Alex Biega, lawyer and author
Chrystia Freeland, editor of the Financial Times (see also "Politicians" section)
Joe Shuster, co-creator of Superman
Marsha Skrypuch, writer
Myroslaw Stechishin, editor, activist, and public figure
Savella Stechishin, home economist and writer
Miriam Toews, writer

Other 

Fedor Bohatirchuk, chess player
Annie Buller, union organizer
Marta Czurylowicz, The Weather Network metrologist and former reporter for CTV News Kitchener and CTV News Winnipeg
Cyril Genik, immigration agent
Bohdan Hawrylyshyn (born 1926), economist, visionary and economic advisor to the Ukrainian government
Vladimir Katriuk, beekeeper and alleged Nazi war criminal
Vladimir Mackiw, inventor and industrialist 
Iwan Pylypow, first Ukrainian Canadian immigrant and pioneer settler
Daria Werbowy, model

See also 
 List of Ukrainian Americans
 List of Ukrainians

References

Canadians

Canada, List
Ukrainian